Up for Grabs...Live is the first live album by American rock band Spin Doctors, released in 1991. It is also their first release.

Track listing

Notes
Studio versions of tracks 1 and 2 appear on their 1994 album Turn It Upside Down; a studio version of track 5 appeared later in 1991 on Pocket Full of Kryptonite.
Tracks 3, 4 and 6 were later incorporated into the band's Homebelly Groove...Live album.

Personnel
 Chris Barron – lead vocals
 Eric Schenkman – guitar, backing vocals
 Mark White – bass
 Aaron Comess – drums

Production
 Peter Denenberg – producer, mixing, engineer
 Frankie La Rocka – producer
 Karen Kuehn – photography
 Paul LaRaia – photography

References

Spin Doctors albums
1991 live albums
Epic Records live albums